Tsentralno-Miskyi District is an urban district of western Kryvyi Rih, south-central Ukraine. It is the location of the historical centre of Kryvyi Rih.

History
Tsentralno-Miskyi District was formed in 1939. Kryvyi Rih grew out of a Cossack settlement that was part of the Ingul Palanka of Zaporozhye Kosh. Until 1939, the Tsentralno-Miskyi District was called Yezhovsky.

References

Urban districts of Kryvyi Rih